Loudervielle is a commune in the Hautes-Pyrénées department in south-western France.

Loudervielle sits in the Bigorre region, in the valley of the river Louron. The west side of the mountain pass Col de Peyresourde lies on the eastern edge of the commune.

The village's original Latin name, found in the church register of Comminges, was De Lodirvilla, and the name in Occitan is Lodervièla.

The village arms are described as azure, a lion or, a chief argent with three crescents of the field, the largest in the middle.

Geography

Sights and monuments
 Church of Sainte-Marie-Madeleine
 12th-century Tour de Moulor, the ruins of a medieval castle.

Climate

Loudervielle has a oceanic climate (Köppen climate classification Cfb).

See also
Communes of the Hautes-Pyrénées department

References

Communes of Hautes-Pyrénées